Outlander may refer to:

Art, entertainment, and media
 Outlander (novel), a 1991 novel by Diana Gabaldon
 Outlander (book series), Gabaldon's novel and its sequels, and derivative works
 Outlander (TV series), a 2014 television series on Starz based on the Outlander book series
 Outlander (film), a 2008 science fiction film directed by Howard McCain and starring James Caviezel
 Outlanders, a post-apocalyptic science fiction book series
 Outlander (video game), a 1992 action video game developed by Mindscape for the Genesis and Super NES platforms
 Outlanders (manga), a manga that ran from 1985 to 1987
 Outlander, a 1970 album by Welsh musician Meic Stevens
 The Outlander, the English translation of two novels by Canadian writer Germaine Guèvremont
 The Outlander (film), a film adaptation of the Guèvremont work by Érik Canuel
 The Outlander, a novel by Gil Adamson

Other uses
 Mitsubishi Outlander, a sport utility vehicle
 Mitsubishi Outlander Sport, another name for the Mitsubishi ASX sport utility vehicle
 , a German word meaning foreigner or legal alien

See also
 Lander (disambiguation)
 Outland (disambiguation)